The Area Study Centre for Europe (ASCE) is a federally funded autonomous research institute in Karachi. Academic oversight is provided by the University of Karachi. It was established in 1975.

Programs
Area Study Centre for Europe offers M.S/ Ph.D. programme in European Studies. The Centre also offers certificate and diploma courses in English, French, and German.

Events
Area Study Centre for Europe (ASCE) regularly organizes international seminars, workshops and conferences on various issues concerning Europe. ASCE arranges an international seminar each year in collaboration with Hanns Seidel Foundation (Germany).

The Centre also works with close co-operation of European Union Delegation to Pakistan. ASCE has also held several seminars and workshops with co-operation of European Union and Goethe- Institut Karachi.

Publications
The research findings of the ASCE's own research staff are regularly published in the form of books, monographs and profiles. The Centre also publishes the bi-annual Journal of European Studies, with articles on contemporary European issues and related topics.

Books

Indices

Profile Series

Jean Monnet Project Papers

See also

 Higher Education Commission of Pakistan
 List of universities in Karachi
 Pakistan Educational Research Network

References

External links
 
 Official website of UoK

University of Karachi
Educational institutions established in 1975
Research institutes in Pakistan
1975 establishments in Pakistan